The Hound of the Baskervilles is the third of the four crime novels by British writer Arthur Conan Doyle featuring the detective Sherlock Holmes. Originally serialised in The Strand Magazine from August 1901 to April 1902, it is set in 1889 largely on Dartmoor in Devon in England's West Country and tells the story of an attempted murder inspired by the legend of a fearsome, diabolical hound of supernatural origin. Holmes and Watson investigate the case. This was the first appearance of Holmes since his apparent death in "The Final Problem", and the success of The Hound of the Baskervilles led to the character's eventual revival.

One of the most famous stories ever written, in 2003, the book was listed as number 128 of 200 on the BBC's The Big Read poll of the UK's "best-loved novel". In 1999, a poll of "Sherlockians" ranked it as the best of the four Holmes novels.

Plot

Dr James Mortimer recounts to Sherlock Holmes in London an old legend of a curse that reportedly runs in the Baskerville family since the time of the English Civil War, when Sir Hugo Baskerville was killed by a huge demonic hound, with the same creature haunting the mires of Dartmoor ever since, causing the premature death of many Baskerville heirs. He reveals that his friend Sir Charles Baskerville, who took the legend of the hound seriously, was found dead in the yew alley of his estate, Baskerville Hall, in the midst of Dartmoor. The death was attributed to a heart attack, but Mortimer reveals that Sir Charles's face retained an expression of horror, and not far from his body were the footprints of a gigantic hound. Mortimer now fears for the next in line, Sir Henry Baskerville.

Though he dismisses the curse as nonsense, Holmes agrees to meet Sir Henry, who is arriving from Canada, where he has been living. A young and jovial man, Sir Henry is sceptical about the legend and is eager to take possession of Baskerville Hall, in spite of receiving an anonymous note, warning him to stay away from the moor. When someone shadows Sir Henry while he is walking down a street, however, Holmes asks Watson to go with Sir Henry and Mortimer to Dartmoor, in order to protect Sir Henry and search for any clues about who is following him. 

The trio arrive at Baskerville Hall. It has a married couple, the Barrymores, as butler and housekeeper. The estate is surrounded by the moor and borders the Grimpen Mire, where animals and humans can sink into mud to their deaths. The news that a convict named Selden, a murderer, has escaped from nearby Dartmoor Prison and is hiding in the nearby barren hills adds to the gloomy atmosphere.

There are inexplicable events during the first night, keeping Sir Henry and Watson awake, and only in the daylight do they relax while exploring the neighbourhood and meeting the few residents. Watson keeps searching for any lead to the identity of whoever is following Sir Henry, and faithfully sends details of his investigations to Holmes. Among the residents, the Stapletons, brother and sister, stand out: Jack is overfriendly and too curious toward Sir Henry and Watson, while Beryl, a beautiful woman, seems all too weary of the place and attempts to warn Sir Henry, via Watson, of danger.

Distant howls and strange sightings trouble Watson during his long walks among the hills, and his mood is no better inside Baskerville Hall. Watson grows suspicious of the butler Barrymore, who at night is signalling from a window of the house with a candle, to someone on the moor. Meanwhile, Sir Henry is drawn to Beryl, who seems to be afraid of her brother's attitude to any relationship. To make the puzzle more complex there is Dr. Mortimer, who is all too eager to convince Sir Henry that the curse is real; Frankland, an old and grumpy neighbour, who likes to pry on others with his telescope; his estranged daughter Laura, who had unclear ties to Sir Charles; and even an unknown man roaming free on the moor and apparently hiding on a tor where ancient tombs have been excavated by Mortimer.

Watson investigates the man on the tor, and discovers that it has been Holmes, who has been hiding on the moor all the time and is close to solving the mystery. He reveals that the hound is real and belongs to Stapleton, who promised Laura marriage and convinced her to lure Sir Charles out of his house at night, in order to frighten him with the hound. Beryl is in fact Jack Stapleton's wife, abused and forced into posing as his sister so as to influence Sir Henry and expose him as well to the hound. The hound kills a man on the moor whom Holmes and Watson fear is Sir Henry, but Barrymore had given the former's clothes to Selden, who is his brother-in-law, and Selden dies instead.

Holmes decides to use Baskerville as bait to catch Stapleton red-handed by having Sir Henry accept an invitation to Stapleton's house and walk back after dark, giving his enemy every chance to unleash the hound on him. Holmes and Watson pretend to leave Dartmoor by train, but instead they hide near Stapleton's house with Inspector Lestrade of Scotland Yard. Despite the dark and a thick fog, Holmes and Watson are able to kill the hound when it attacks Sir Henry. They find in Stapleton’s house the bound and badly abused Beryl, while Stapleton, in his panicked flight from the scene, seemingly drowns in the mire. Back in London, Holmes remarks to Watson that not only was Stapleton a physical and spiritual throwback to Sir Hugo Baskerville, being a lost relation of Sir Charles, but also that he was one of the most formidable foes Holmes had ever encountered.

Origins and background

Sir Arthur Conan Doyle wrote this story shortly after returning to his home Undershaw in Surrey from South Africa, where he had worked as a volunteer physician at the Langman Field Hospital in Bloemfontein during the Second Boer War. He had not written about Sherlock Holmes in eight years, having killed off the character in the 1893 story "The Final Problem". Although The Hound of the Baskervilles is set before the latter events, two years later Conan Doyle brought Holmes back for good, explaining in "The Adventure of the Empty House" that Holmes had faked his own death. As a result, the character of Holmes occupies a liminal space between being alive and dead which further lends to the gothic elements of the novel.

He was assisted with the legend of the hound and local colour by a Daily Express journalist named Bertram Fletcher Robinson (1870–1907), with whom he explored Dartmoor in June, 1901, and to whom a  royalty which amounted to over 500 pounds by the end of 1901.

Conan Doyle may also have been inspired by his own earlier story (written and published in 1898) of a terrifying giant wolf, "The King of the Foxes".

Inspiration
His ideas came from the legend of Squire Richard Cabell of Brook Hall, in the parish of Buckfastleigh, Devon, which was the fundamental inspiration for the Baskerville tale of a hellish hound and a cursed country squire. Cabell's tomb survives in the town of Buckfastleigh.

Cabell lived for hunting, and was what in those days was described as a "monstrously evil man". He gained this reputation, amongst other things, for immorality and having sold his soul to the Devil. There was also a rumour that he had murdered his wife, Elizabeth Fowell, a daughter of Sir Edmund Fowell, 1st Baronet (1593–1674), of Fowelscombe. On 5 July 1677, he died and was buried in the sepulchre. The night of his interment saw a phantom pack of hounds come baying across the moor to howl at his tomb. From that night on, he could be found leading the phantom pack across the moor, usually on the anniversary of his death. If the pack were not out hunting, they could be found ranging around his grave howling and shrieking. To try to lay the soul to rest, the villagers built a large building around the tomb, and to be doubly sure a huge slab was placed.

Moreover, Devon's folklore includes tales of a fearsome supernatural dog known as the Yeth hound that Conan Doyle may have heard. 

Weller (2002) believes that Baskerville Hall is based on one of three possible houses on or near Dartmoor: Fowelscombe in the parish of Ugborough, the seat of the Fowell Baronets; Hayford Hall, near Buckfastleigh (also owned by John King (d.1861) of Fowelscombe) and Brook Hall, in the parish of Buckfastleigh, about two miles east of Hayford, the actual home of Richard Cabell. It has also been claimed that Baskerville Hall is based on a property in Mid Wales, built in 1839 by one Thomas Mynors Baskerville. The house was formerly named Clyro Court and was renamed Baskerville Hall towards the end of the 19th century. Arthur Conan Doyle was apparently a family friend who often stayed there and may have been aware of a local legend of the hound of the Baskervilles.

Still other tales claim that Conan Doyle was inspired by a holiday in North Norfolk, where the tale of Black Shuck is well known. The pre-Gothic Cromer Hall, where Conan Doyle stayed, also closely resembles Doyle's vivid descriptions of Baskerville Hall.

James Lynam Molloy, a friend of Doyle's, and author of "Love's Old Sweet Song", married Florence Baskerville, daughter of Henry Baskerville of Crowsley Park, Oxfordshire. The gates to the park had statues of hell hounds, spears through their mouths. Above the lintel there was another statue of a hell hound.

Technique

The novel incorporates five plots: the ostensible 'curse' story, the two red-herring subplots concerning Selden and the other stranger living on the moor, the actual events occurring to Baskerville as narrated by Watson, and the hidden plot to be discovered by Holmes. The structure of the novel starting and ending in the familiar setting in London is used to ‘delimit the uncanny world associated with the Gothic landscape of the moors’, with varying degrees of success. Doyle wrote that the novel was originally conceived as a straight 'Victorian creeper' (as seen in the works of J. Sheridan Le Fanu), with the idea of introducing Holmes as the deus ex machina only arising later.

Publication
The Hound of the Baskervilles was first serialised in The Strand Magazine in 1901. It was well-suited for this type of publication, as individual chapters end in cliffhangers. It was printed in the United Kingdom as a novel in March 1902 by George Newnes Ltd. It was published in the same year in the United States by McClure, Philips & Co.

Original manuscript 

In 1902, Doyle's original manuscript of the book was broken up into individual leaves as part of a promotional campaign by Doyle's American publisher – they were used in window displays by individual booksellers. Out of an estimated 185–190 leaves, only 37 are known still to exist, including all the leaves from Chapter 11, held by the New York Public Library. Other leaves are owned by university libraries and private collectors.

A newly rediscovered example was sold at auction in 2012 for US$158,500.

Adaptations 
The Hound of the Baskervilles has been adapted in various forms of media.

Film and television adaptations
Over 20 film and television versions of The Hound of the Baskervilles have been made.

Audio

Edith Meiser adapted the novel as six episodes of the radio series The Adventures of Sherlock Holmes. The episodes aired in February and March 1932, with Richard Gordon as Sherlock Holmes and Leigh Lovell as Dr. Watson. Another dramatisation of the story aired in November and December 1936, with Gordon as Holmes and Harry West as Watson.

The story was also adapted by Meiser as six episodes of The New Adventures of Sherlock Holmes with Basil Rathbone as Holmes and Nigel Bruce as Watson. The episodes aired in January and February 1941.

A dramatisation of the novel by Felix Felton aired on the BBC Light Programme in 1958 as part of the 1952–1969 radio series, with Carleton Hobbs as Sherlock Holmes and Norman Shelley as Dr. Watson. A different production of The Hound of the Baskervilles, also adapted by Felton and starring Hobbs and Shelley with a different supporting cast, aired in 1961 on the BBC Home Service.

The novel was adapted as an episode of CBS Radio Mystery Theater. The episode, which aired in 1977, starred Kevin McCarthy as Holmes and Lloyd Battista as Watson.

The Hound of the Baskervilles has been adapted for radio for the BBC by Bert Coules on two occasions. The first starred Roger Rees as Holmes and Crawford Logan as Watson and was broadcast in 1988 on BBC Radio 4. Following its good reception, Coules proposed further radio adaptations, which eventually led to the 1989–1998 radio series of dramatisations of the entire canon, starring Clive Merrison as Holmes and Michael Williams as Watson. The second adaptation of The Hound of the Baskervilles, featuring this pairing, was broadcast in 1998, and also featured Judi Dench as Mrs. Hudson and Donald Sinden as Sir Charles Baskerville.

Clive Nolan and Oliver Wakeman adapted The Hound of the Baskervilles as a progressive rock album in 2002, with narration by Robert Powell.

The Hound of the Baskervilles was adapted as three episodes of the American radio series The Classic Adventures of Sherlock Holmes, with John Patrick Lowrie as Holmes and Lawrence Albert as Watson. The episodes first aired in March 2008.

In 2011, Big Finish Productions released their adaptation of the book as part of their second series of Holmes dramas. Holmes was played by Nicholas Briggs, and Watson was played by Richard Earl.

In 2014, L.A. Theatre Works released their production, starring Seamus Dever as Holmes, Geoffrey Arend as Watson, James Marsters as Sir Henry, Sarah Drew as Beryl Stapleton, Wilson Bethel as Stapleton, Henri Lubatti as Dr. Mortimer, Christopher Neame as Sir Charles and Frankland, Moira Quirk as Mrs. Hudson & Mrs. Barrymore, and Darren Richardson as Barrymore.

In July 2020, Lions Den Theatre released a new adaptation of the novel written and directed by Keith Morrison on the company's YouTube channel. An early version of the play was performed in various locations around Nova Scotia in 2018.

In November 2021, Audible released an adaptation of the story starring Colin Salmon as Sherlock Holmes and Stephen Fry as Doctor John Watson.

Stage
In 2007, Peepolykus Theatre Company premiered a new adaptation of The Hound of the Baskervilles at West Yorkshire Playhouse in Leeds. Adapted by John Nicholson and Steven Canny, the production involves only three actors and was praised by critics for its physical comedy. Following a U.K. tour, it transferred to the Duchess Theatre in London's West End. The Daily Telegraph described it as a ‘wonderfully delightful spoof’, whilst The Sunday Times praised its ‘mad hilarity that will make you feel quite sane’. This adaptation continues to be presented by both amateur and professional companies around the world.

Stage performances have also been performed in the U.K. in dramatisations by Joan Knight, Claire Malcolmson, Harry Meacher, and Roger Sansom, among others. Meacher's version has been produced three times, each time with himself the actor playing Holmes.

Ken Ludwig authored an adaptation entitled Baskerville: A Sherlock Holmes mystery which premiered as a co-production at Arena Stage (Washington, D.C.) in January 2015 and McCarter Theatre Center in March 2015.

In 2021 an adaption for the stage by Steven Canny and John Nicholson for Peepolykus, directed by Tim Jackson & Lotte Wakeman toured the UK produced by Original Theatre Company and Bolton's Octagon Theatre. It was a continuation the adaptation that was directed by Lotte Wakeman for English Theatre, Frankfurt, Jermyn St Theatre and Octagon, Bolton.

Video games
The Hound of the Baskervilles is utilised in the final case in The Great Ace Attorney: Adventures in which the protagonist teams up with Herlock Sholmes (Sherlock Holmes in the original Japanese version) to investigate mysteries based on various entries in the Holmes chronology. In particular, the manuscript of The Hound of the Baskervilles is a key part of the case.

Sherlock Holmes and the Hound of the Baskervilles is a casual game by Frogwares. It departs from the original plot by introducing clear supernatural elements. Despite its non-canonical plot, it received good reviews.

Related works
 The film The Life and Death of Colonel Blimp (1941) makes references to The Hound of the Baskervilles.
 Mad magazine satirized this novel in issue #16 (October 1954) as "The Hound of the Basketballs", art by Bill Elder.
 Disney cartoonist Carl Barks parodied this story with The Hound of the Whiskervilles (1960), starring Uncle Scrooge. 
 A 1965 issue of Walt Disney's Comics and Stories (comic book) featured The Hound of Basketville, starring Mickey Mouse, Goofy, Gladstone Gander, and Pluto, as Sherlock Mouse, Doctor Goofy, Sir Gladstone Basketville, and the hound.
 In 1971, German schlager vocal duo Cindy & Bert covered Black Sabbath's groundbreaking 1970 heavy metal song Paranoid with lyrics based on The Hound of the Baskervilles as "Der Hund von Baskerville". The unlikely cover version with a heavy hammond organ, featured in a TV show with a tiny Pekingese dog standing in as "hound" and dancers getting ushered back to their seats, has become a collector's curiosity and a document of 1971 zeitgeist. 
 Stapleton reappears in Richard L. Boyer's version of The Giant Rat of Sumatra (1976). It turns out that he did not die, as Holmes and Watson assumed, but had escaped by another route, committing further crimes and vowing vengeance on Sherlock Holmes.
 William of Baskerville, protagonist of Umberto Eco's novel The Name of the Rose (1980), is a Franciscan friar and a sleuth, inspired by Sherlock Holmes and perhaps William of Occam and other real and fictional characters.
 The Hound of Baskerville played a short role in the animated feature The Pagemaster (1994).
 The hound of the Baskervilles is a character in Kouta Hirano's supernatural manga series Hellsing (1997–2008).
 Spike Milligan satirised the novel in his book, The Hound of the Baskervilles According to Spike Milligan (1997), combining elements of the original novel with the Basil Rathbone serials.
 The Moor (1998), a novel in Laurie R. King's series about Sherlock Holmes and Mary Russell, uses the setting and various plot elements, with Holmes returning to Dartmoor on a later case. 
 Pierre Bayard's book Sherlock Holmes Was Wrong (2008) re-opens the case and, by careful re-examination of all the clues, clears the hound of all wrongdoing and argues that the actual murderer got away with the crime completely unsuspected by Holmes, countless readers of the book over the past century—and even, in a sense, the author himself.
 The Hound of Baskervilles mysterious elements were used as inspiration for the demon hound Pluto in the anime Black Butler (2011–2017).

Critical reception

On 5 November 2019, The Hound of the Baskervilles appeared on the BBC list of 100 'most inspiring' novels issued by BBC News.

See also

 Baskerville effect
 Edinburgh Phrenological Society
 Le Monde 100 Books of the Century
 Princetown#Geography

References

External links

 
 
 
 The Hound of the Baskervilles (Part I) at BFRonline.biz.
 The Hound of the Baskervilles (Part II) at BFRonline.biz.
 The Hound of the Baskervilles (Conclusion) at BFRonline.biz.
 

1902 British novels
Fiction set in 1889
Novels set in the 1880s
Dartmoor
Dogs in literature
British Gothic novels
Mythological dogs
Novels first published in serial form
Novels set in Devon
Novels set in London
Sherlock Holmes novels by Arthur Conan Doyle
Works originally published in The Strand Magazine
British novels adapted into films
Works set in country houses
George Newnes Ltd books